Of the 31 individuals who have served as prime minister of Australia, 8 have had prior or concurrent military service, while 23 have had no prior military service. Despite the fact that the democratically accountable Australian Cabinet (chaired by the Prime Minister) de facto controls the Australian Defence Force, prior military service is not a prerequisite for prime ministers of Australia. They are as followed:

Notes

References 

Commonwealth Members of Parliament who have served in war

Australia
Military